Michael: A German Destiny in Diary Form is a semi-autobiographical novel authored by the German propagandist Joseph Goebbels, it was rejected for publication but later published in 1929 by NSDAP officials against Goebbels' wishes. It is a three-part work of which only Parts I and III have survived. The novel is a combination of Goebbels' own thoughts and the life of his best friend Richard Flisges who had actually fought in World War I, and later ended his college studies to work in a mine where he died in an accident. That is what happens to the novel's protagonist Michael who meets his "sacrificial death" on 30 January 1921.

Michael was a significant popular success, going through seventeen printings.

Plot
In a diary form the story follows the journey of Michael, a fictional character who represents a young Joseph Goebbels. At the beginning of the novel Michael has just returned home from service in the Great War. He finds a new democratic Germany which invokes feelings of both love and hate. Throughout the novel Michael wrestles with this mix of nationalist pride and anger towards Weimar Germany and he explores his personal philosophy and belief system.

Political commentary
The book emphasises the Völkisch ideals held by Goebbels early in his political career.

Religious commentary
In the novel Goebbels gives praise to Christianity, and describes Jesus as one of the finest men to have ever lived. He also demonstrates his early socialist sympathies when he stated that Germans had to be "something like Christ Socialists"  The book also explores nature of God and the contemporary man: "modern man...is intrinsically a seeker of God, perhaps a Christ-man."

Goebbels retained a small amount of Christianity, but an eccentric form, which  diminished even more after the failed church reform program in 1934-35.

Historical analysis
One of Joseph Goebbels' biographers, Joachim Fest (who was also Hitler's biographer), suggests that Michael sheds light on Goebbels' state of mind and self-image: "The very name of the hero, Michael, to whom he gave many autobiographical features, suggests the way his self-identification was pointing: a figure of light, radiant, tall, unconquerable," and above all "'To be a soldier! To stand sentinel! One ought always to be a soldier,' wrote Michael-Goebbels."

References

External links
 

1929 German-language novels
Novels set in Germany
Joseph Goebbels